Extreme Celebrity Detox was a reality television programme on Channel 4, the British public-service television broadcaster, in 2005.  Fifteen British celebrities were sent to try a range of detox programmes, which aimed to enhance inner peace.  The celebrities were split into four groups where they would try different detox programmes.

The celebrities and detox they tried were:
Tai chi: Dominik Diamond, Jilly Goolden, Catherine McQueen, Jack Osbourne
Tao: Brandon Block, Carol Harrison, Rebecca Loos, Normski
Yoga: James Brown, Magenta Devine, Lisa I'Anson, Rowland Rivron
Shamanism: Mina Anwar, Jo Guest, Tony Wilson

External links 
 Extreme Celebrity Detox at Channel4.com

Channel 4 original programming
British reality television series